

Events 
none listed

Published music 
Lodovico Agostini -  for four voices (Milan: Cesare Pozzo)
Giovanni Animuccia – First book of masses (Rome: Valerio Dorico & Luigi Dorico)
Jacques Arcadelt
Third book of chansons (Paris: Le Roy & Ballard)
Fourth book of chansons (Paris: Le Roy & Ballard)
Fifth book of chansons (Paris: Le Roy & Ballard)
Joachim a Burck –  (Mühlhausen: Georg Hantzsch)
Giovanni Battista Conforti – First book of madrigals for five voices (Venice), edited by Claudio Merulo
Nicolao Dorati – Fourth book of madrigals for five voices (Venice: Antonio Gardano)
Giovanni Ferretti –  for five voices (Venice: Girolamo Scotto)
Giulio Fiesco – Second book of madrigals for five voices (Venice)
Jacquet of Mantua –  for four and five voices (Venice, 1567), a collection of sacred music for Holy Week, published posthumously
Orlande de Lassus
 for six, five, and four voices (Nuremberg: Theodor Gerlach)
Fourth book of madrigals for five voices (Venice: Antonio Gardano)
 for five voices (Munich: Adam Berg)
Claudio Merulo – , Libro primo
Philippe de Monte – Second book of madrigals for five voices (Venice: Antonio Gardano)
Giovanni Domenico da Nola –  (The First Book of Neapolitan style villanellas) for three and four voices (Venice: Claudio Merulo & Fausto Betanio)
Annibale Padovano – First book of motets for five and six voices (Venice: Antonio Gardano)
Giovanni Pierluigi da Palestrina – Second book of masses (Rome: heirs of Valerio & Luigi Dorico)

Births 
February 12 – Thomas Campion, English composer, poet and physician (died 1620)
May 15 (baptised) – Claudio Monteverdi, Italian composer (died 1643)
December 15 – Christoph Demantius, composer and music theorist (died 1643)

Deaths 
January 8 – Jacobus Vaet, Franco-Flemish composer (born c.1529)
date unknown – Bartolomeo Trosylho, Portuguese composer (born 1500)

 
Music
16th century in music
Music by year